Igor Mironovich Guberman (born 7 July 1936, Kharkiv) is a Russian writer and poet of Jewish ancestry; since 1988 lives in Israel. His poetry has received a great deal of acclaim primarily because of his signature aphoristic and satiric quatrains that he called gariki in Russian (singular: garik, which is also the diminutive form of the author's first name, Igor). (Gariki).  These short poems (originally Guberman called them "Jewish Dazibao") usually feature an a-b-a-b rhyme scheme, employ various poetic meters, and cover a wide range of subjects including antisemitism, immigrant life, anti-religious sentiment, and the author's complicated relationship with Russia, Israel, and the respective cultures. Gariki are mostly humorous and often paradoxical, verging on philosophical.

Biography

Igor Guberman was born in Kharkiv on July 7, 1936.  After high school, he entered the Moscow State University of Railway Engineering where, in contrast to the most prestigious Russian universities, there was not a maximum quota for Jews.  In 1958, he graduated with a degree in electrical engineering.  He worked as an electrical engineer for several years and wrote on the side in his spare time.  Toward the end of the 1950s, he was introduced to Alexander Ginzburg, who published Syntax, one of the first samizdat periodicals, as well as to other underground philosophers, writers, and artists. For some time he worked as a secretary to the great Russian poet David Samoylov, and also as a ghostwriter for hire.

At first, Guberman wrote popular science books (such as "Third Triumvirate"), but he gradually became more and more active as a dissident poet.  Guberman published his underground work under the pseudonyms I. Mironov and Abram Khayyam, connecting the names of the famous Persian poet Omar Khayyám and the Jewish first name Abram.
 
In 1979, Guberman was arrested and sentenced based on fabricated charges to five years in the Labor Camps. He based his book, Walks Around the Barracks (written in 1980, published in 1988), on the diaries he kept during his time in the Gulag.

In 1984, Guberman returned from Siberia. For a long time, he could get neither a job nor a residence permit (Propiska) to live in Moscow. In 1987, Guberman emigrated from the USSR, and since 1988 he has been living in Jerusalem. He visits Russia quite frequently to attend poetry readings.  Books by Guberman have sold hundreds of thousands of copies in Russia and in countries with Russian immigrant communities, with whom they are always popular.

In 2017 he was interviewed by Echo Moskvy, the interviewer regarding the interview as "timeless", as it would fit into even future time because Vladimir Putin was never mentioned - although constantly present.

Quatrains
Examples of Guberman's quatrains:

'*A play on the double meaning of word перо: pen and feather; hence: пух, meaning down.

References

External links
Igor Guberman. Poems (in Russian)
Selected gariki in English (translated by Boris Meshcheryakov)

1936 births
Living people
Writers from Kharkiv
Ukrainian Jews
Soviet emigrants to Israel
Russian male poets
Russian-language poets
Jewish poets
Israeli poets
Russian satirists
Russian non-fiction writers
Soviet dissidents
Soviet prisoners and detainees
Russian-language writers
Male non-fiction writers